Jervis Joslin (September 29, 1835 – January 4, 1899) was an American politician who served as the 5th Mayor of Cheyenne, Wyoming.

Early life

Jervis Joslin was born on September 29, 1835, to Joseph Joslin and Caroline C. Ruggles in Poultney, Vermont. After graduating from school he started working in jewelry businesses in Poultney. In 1866, he moved to Denver in the Colorado Territory and started a business partnership with Boyd Park named Joslin & Park that would last until his death in 1899.

Joslin and Park established jewelry businesses in Denver in May 1866, Cheyenne on December 17, 1867, Salt Lake City in 1871, and Leadville in 1879. In 1867, he married Marian F. Hastings and would later have a son and daughter with her. In 1868, their store in Cheyenne burned down causing $3,000 to $4,000 in losses, but it was rebuilt.

Politics

In 1869, he was nominated for a seat in the Wyoming Territorial legislature. In 1871, he was elected as mayor of Cheyenne, Wyoming Territory. In 1873, he was elected as a member of the Colorado Territorial Legislature.

Later life

In 1880, he closed the jewelry store in Cheyenne and consolidated Joslin & Park in Leadville. In 1887, the store in Leadville was closed and he moved to Denver.

Joslin died from pneumonia in Denver, Colorado, on January 4, 1899. In March 1900, Samuel Culver Park, the son of Boyd Park, purchased Joslin's interest in the business from his estate and the name of his business was changed from Joslin & Park to Boyd Park.

References

External links

1835 births
1899 deaths
19th-century American politicians
Mayors of Cheyenne, Wyoming